Linnaea dipelta, synonym Dipelta floribunda, is a species of deciduous shrub in the family Caprifoliaceae. It is native to China.
In late spring and early summer it produces masses of white trumpet-shaped flowers with orange throats.

In cultivation it prefers alkaline soils with full sun or partial shade. As Dipelta floribunda it has received the Royal Horticultural Society's Award of Garden Merit.

References

External links
 
 

Flora of China
Caprifoliaceae